Nikoloudis is a Greek surname. It is the surname of:
 Alexandros Nikoloudis (1874–1944), Greek architect
 Panagiotis Nikoloudis (born 1949), Greek independent politician and Transparency Minister of Greece.
 Takis Nikoloudis (born 1951), Greece national team footballer.
 Theologos Nikoloudis (1890–1946), Greek politician and government minister.

Greek-language surnames
Surnames